The Wyoming Liberty Group is a free market think tank in Wyoming, United States. Founded in 2008, the group "invites citizens to prepare for informed, active and confident involvement in local and state government."

Activity
In 2011, the Wyoming Liberty Group criticized the American Recovery and Reinvestment Act of 2009, arguing that $400,000 had been spent for each job created.

Wyoming Liberty Group has argued against government expansion and for private sector solutions, arguing the European welfare state is detrimental to freedom and individual development.

In 2015, the Wyoming Liberty Group launched a national group, the Pillar of Law Institute. The group's aim is to fight restrictive campaign finance laws, which it characterizes as a free speech issue.

References

External links
 Official website
 Organizational Profile – National Center for Charitable Statistics (Urban Institute)

Political and economic think tanks in the United States
Conservative organizations in the United States
Organizations based in Cheyenne, Wyoming
Organizations established in 2008
2008 establishments in Wyoming